Miloš Pejić (born 22 October 1968) is a Serbian professional basketball coach and former player.

Coaching career
Pejić coached Mašinac, Sloga and Radnički FMP of the Basketball League of Serbia. On April 18, 2008, Pejić became a head coach for the Borac Banja Luka after Slobodan Nikolić got fired. In January 2009, he parted ways with Borac.

During the 2014–15 season, Pejić coached the Gevgelija-based team Kožuv of the Macedonian First League and the Balkan International Basketball League.

In November 2015, Pejić became a head coach for the Vršac Swisslion. Prior to start of 2016–17 season, Pejić was named as a head coach for the Lovćen 1947 of the Montenegrin League.

In January 2018, Pejić was named head coach for KK Bosna Royal of the Basketball Championship of Bosnia and Herzegovina. He left Bosnia in March 2018.

During the 2018–19 season, Pejić coached the Tbilisi-based team BC Vera of the Georgian A-Liga (2nd tier).

In October 2019, Pejić became a head coach for Satria Muda Pertamina of the Indonesian Basketball League.

Career achievements
 Indonesian Basketball League champion: 1 (with Satria Muda Pertamina: 2021)
 Georgian A-Liga champion: 1 (with Vera Tbilisi: 2018–19)
 Serbian League Cup winner: 2  (with Radnički Basket/Radnički FMP: 2010–11, 2011–12)
 Republika Srpska Cup winner: 1  (with Borac Banja Luka: 2008–09)

References

External links
Coach Profile at eurobasket.com

1968 births
Living people
OKK Borac coaches
KK Bosna Royal coaches
KK FMP coaches
KK Lovćen coaches
KK Mašinac coaches
KK Mašinac players
KK Sloga coaches
KK Sloga players
KK Vršac coaches
People from Vrnjačka Banja
Small forwards
Serbian men's basketball coaches
Serbian men's basketball players
Serbian expatriate basketball people in Bosnia and Herzegovina
Serbian expatriate basketball people in Georgia (country)
Serbian expatriate basketball people in Indonesia
Serbian expatriate basketball people in Iran
Serbian expatriate basketball people in Montenegro
Serbian expatriate basketball people in North Macedonia